I Am Losing Weight is a 2018 Russian sports comedy film directed by Aleksey Nuzhnyy. The film stars Aleksandra Bortich, Irina Gorbacheva, Yevgeny Kulik and Roman Kurtsyn.

The premiere of the film in Russia took place on March 8, 2018, the gross for the first day of the rental amounted to 1.9 million dollars - as of mid-March this was the best achievement among Russian films of 2018, and for the first four days - up to 5.8 million dollars, which brought the film to the ninth place of the weekly ranking.

Plot
The action takes place in Nizhny Novgorod. Anya Kulikova only loves food and her boyfriend - athlete Zhenya. But Zhenya is not pleased with Anya because she has put on a lot of weight and he decides to leave her. But Anya does not give up and sets a goal to get rid of excess weight. And Kolya Barabanov is there to help her, an overweight man obsessed with the healthy way of living.

Cast
 Aleksandra Bortich as Anna "Anya" Kulikova  
 Irina Gorbacheva as Natalia "Natasha"
 Yevgeny Kulik as Nikolai "Kolya" Barabanov  
 Roman Kurtsyn as Yevgeny "Zhenya ", coach for swimming
 Yelena Valyushkina as Olga, Anya's mom
 Mikhail Orlov as Semyon, friend of Olga
 Sergey Shnurov as Sergey Kulikov, Anya's father
 Anna Kotova as Diana, Sergey's wife
 Alexander Ptashenchuk as Dimas, Natasha's husband, DJ
 Valeria Dergileva as Christina
 Andrey Trushin as fitness instructor
 Oleg Kassin as Grisha, combine operator
 Anna Ichetokina as laughing woman
 Alena Ermolaeva as Alena

Production
Aleksandra Bortich had to gain and lose 20 kg over the course of the making of the film.

The authors of the film offered the main role to Irina Gorbacheva, but she did not wanted to gain weight.

Producer Ilya Naishuller played a smoked guest at a party - for this, he spent the whole shooting day on the couch with a blurred look and a bong in his hands.

Before starting work on the film, director Aleksey Nuzhnyy and screenwriter Nikolay Kulikov lost 28 and 20 kg, respectively.

Work on the script went on for two and a half years. During this time, the authors interviewed a large number of girls and women who are concerned about the topic of losing weight, so that everything in the film is as truthful as possible. There were 17 draft scripts in total.

Filming
The filming period was divided into two blocks. In the first block - May and June 2017 - Aleksandra Bortich was shot in full. After that, there was a break when Aleksandra Bortich switched to strict nutrition and trained 7 days a week. For a month and a half she lost weight and filming resumed.

Aleksandra Bortich herself performed many tricks in the film: she climbed from the balcony to the balcony on the eighth floor, jumped from the pier into the water at a temperature of less than 10 degrees, ran out of the burning bath in a burning sheet.

Criticism
According to film critic Anton Dolin (ru), despite the predictable plot, overkill with views of the city to pop music and the not very appropriate role of Sergey Shnurov, all the "shortcomings are fully paid for by the merits" of the film.

Release 
The film was released in the Russian Federation by Universal Pictures International on March 8, 2018.

Reception
The film received mostly positive reviews, acting of Bortich and the script received praise.

Box office 
The fees for the first day of rental amounted to 110 million rubles - as of mid-March this is the best achievement among Russian films in 2018, and for the first four days - up to 331 million rubles ($5.8 million), which brought the film to the ninth place of the weekly world rating. By early August, total fees exceeded 630 million rubles ($10 million).

References

External links
  
 

2010s sports comedy-drama films
2018 romantic comedy-drama films
Russian sports comedy-drama films
Body image in popular culture
2010s feminist films
Films about obesity
Films set in Nizhny Novgorod
Russian romantic comedy-drama films
2018 comedy films